Carl-Johan Björk (born February 26, 1982) is a former American football linebacker in NFL Europe for the Amsterdam Admirals. He also was a member of the Dallas Cowboys, Green Bay Packers and Cincinnati Bengals in the National Football League.

Early years
Björk played with Team Europe, which was a squad of top junior players from Europe, that was put together to compete against high school All-star teams from the United States, Canada, Mexico and Japan. He was a member of the Swedish National team and was also a two-time Nordic champion.

He was a three-time Swedish champion with the Stockholm Mean Machines. In 2004, he was named the MVP in the Swedish league.

Professional career

Amsterdam Admirals (NFLEL)
In 2005, Björk was signed by the Amsterdam Admirals of NFL Europe, with nine years of previous amateur American football experience. He was a backup linebacker, posting 27 tackles, one forced fumble and a fumble recovery.

In 2006, he started 10 games, registering 47 tackles and one interception. On April 10, he received National Player of the Week honors, after making 6 tackles and one interception against the Berlin Thunder.

In 2007, he returned to play for the Admirals and was a starter at linebacker.

Dallas Cowboys
On June 15, 2006, he was allocated by the league to the Dallas Cowboys, as part of the NFL International Development Practice Squad Program. At the time, the best international players with previous NFL Europe League experience, were allotted to some NFL teams every year on a rotating basis, with clubs acquiring one player per roster. These players were exempted by the league from counting on the preseason roster, as well as on the practice squad during the regular season. He wasn't re-signed after the season.

Green Bay Packers
On July 9, 2007, he was allocated by the NFL to the Green Bay Packers to join the team's practice squad. He wasn't re-signed after the season.

Cincinnati Bengals
On July 15, 2008, he was allocated by the league to the Cincinnati Bengals to join the team's practice squad. He wasn't re-signed after the season.

Personal life
Björk served as an in studio host/analyst for NFL broadcasts on Sweden's Viasat coverage of American football carried on TV3 Sport.

References

External links
Carl-Johan Björk Statistics
Cincinnati Bengals bio

1982 births
Living people
American football linebackers
Amsterdam Admirals players
Cincinnati Bengals players
Dallas Cowboys players
Green Bay Packers players
Sportspeople from Stockholm
Swedish players of American football